Allose is an aldohexose sugar.  It is a rare monosaccharide that occurs as a 6-O-cinnamyl glycoside in the leaves of the African shrub Protea rubropilosa. Extracts from the fresh-water alga Ochromas malhamensis contain this sugar but of unknown absolute configuration. It is soluble in water and practically insoluble in methanol.

Allose is a C-3 epimer of glucose.

Notes

References
 Carbohydrates, edited by P.M. Collins, Chapman and Hall, 

Aldohexoses